Odites issikii is a moth in the family Depressariidae. It was described by Ryoichi Takahashi in 1930. It is found in Japan, Korea, China and Russia.

The wingspan is 14–19 mm.

The larvae have been recorded feeding on Gardenis jasminioides (should this be Gardenia jasminoides), Malus pumila, Pyrus simonii, Populus nigra, Prunus species, Salix species, Smilax china, Ulmus pavifolia, Viburnum awabuki and Weigela coreaensis.

References

Moths described in 1930
Odites